Bray Magazine is a theatrical cartoon series consisting of three-minute shorts made by Bray Productions. Bray Magazine lasted from December 16, 1922 to 1923. The series was directed by Milt Gross.

Filmography

1922
 Strap Hangers 
 Bobby Bumps at School 
 Taxes

1923
 If We Reversed (1923)

References

External links
http://www.bcdb.com/cartoons/Paramount_Pictures/Bray_Productions/Bray_Magazine/index.html

Film series introduced in 1922
1920s animated short films
1920s American animated films
Animated film series
American black-and-white films
American animated short films
Bray Productions film series